Allah Dad-e Zehi (also Romanized as Allāh Dād-e Zehī; also known as Aldād Zehī, Allāhābād, Allāh Dād, Allāh Dād Zā’ī, Allāh Zā’ī, Allāhzī, and Ilāhdād) is a village in Polan Rural District, Polan District, Chabahar County, Sistan and Baluchestan Province, Iran. At the 2006 census, its population was 266, in 40 families.

References 

Populated places in Chabahar County